The 1998 All-Ireland Under-21 Football Championship was the 35th staging of the All-Ireland Under-21 Football Championship since its establishment by the Gaelic Athletic Association in 1964.

Derry entered the championship as defending champions, however, they were defeated by Armagh in the Ulster final.

On 9 May 1998, Kerry won the championship following a 2-8 to 0-11 defeat of Laois in the All-Ireland final. This was their ninth All-Ireland title overall and their first in two championship seasons.

Results

All-Ireland Under-21 Football Championship

Semi-finals

Finals

Statistics

Miscellaneous

 Armagh win the Ulster title for the first time in their history.

References

1998
All-Ireland Under-21 Football Championship